Aleksandr Vladimirovich Ionov (born 29 March 1983) is a Russian former professional football player.

Club career
He made his debut for FC Lokomotiv Moscow on 29 November 2002 in a Russian Cup game against FC Dynamo Makhachkala. In 2003 he appeared twice for Lokomotiv in the Russian Premier League Cup.

He played 4 seasons in the Russian Football National League for 4 different clubs.

Personal life
He is an identical twin brother of forward Konstantin Ionov.

External links

External links
 

1983 births
People from Shatursky District
Russian twins
Twin sportspeople
Living people
Russian footballers
Russia under-21 international footballers
Association football midfielders
FC Lokomotiv Moscow players
FC Volgar Astrakhan players
FC Sokol Saratov players
FC Metallurg Lipetsk players
FC KAMAZ Naberezhnye Chelny players
FC Ufa players
Sportspeople from Moscow Oblast